Mahatma Kabir is a 1947 Indian Kannada-language film directed by R. Nagendra Rao. He also stars in the lead role alongside Subbaiah Naidu. The film deals with Mahatma Gandhi's vision of harmony between the Hindus and Muslims. It was set in the backdrop of the religious violence in India that took place after the Independence from the British rule.

Cast
 R. Nagendra Rao
 Subbaiah Naidu
 Lakshmi Bai
 Kamalabai
 M. G. Mari Rao
 H. R. Shastry

Reception
The Indian Express called the film a "fine picture". The reviewer wrote, "The picture has [Rao's] best directorial touches in all the important sequences and the quality of photography, recording and costumes have aptly contributed for the good standard of the production." He further added, "Mr. Nagendra Rao deserves congratulations for his achievement in ably directing this in the most suitable way to tackle the present-day problems."

References

External links
 

1940s Kannada-language films
Films about religious violence in India
Indian black-and-white films